This list includes notable people from Sialkot, Pakistan.

Poets/singers
 Faiz Ahmad Faiz, poet
 Allama Muhammad Iqbal, poet
 Ghulam Ali, Ghazal singer 
 Bilal Saeed, singer
 Taufiq Rafat, poet
 Asghar Sodai, Poet, and creator of the phrase "Pakistan ka matlab kya La Ila Ha ILLILLAH"

Politicians
 Chaudhry Sir Muhammad Zafarullah Khan
 Chaudhry Naseer Ahmad Malhi
 Mumtaz Kahloon
 Khawaja Asif, politician and banker
 Usman Dar, Politician and businessman
 Gulzari Lal Nanda, politician and economist,
 Chaudhry Amir Hussain, politician
 Khawaja Muhammad Safdar, 
 Rehman Malik, politician
 Mushahid Hussain Syed
 Ansir Iqbal Baryar
 Firdous Ashiq Awan

Athletes
 Zahid Sheikh, hockey player
 Shahnaz Sheikh, hockey player
 Shoaib Malik, cricketer
 Zaheer Abbas, cricketer
 Zahid Fazal, cricketer
 Shaiman Anwar, cricketer
 Sikandar Raza, Zimbabwean Cricketer Born in Sialkot 
 Mohammad Abbas, cricketer
 Raza Hasan, cricketer 
 Mukhtar Ahmed, cricketer
 Asif Bajwa, hockey player
 Haris Sohail, cricketer
 Bilal Asif, cricketer
 Bilawal Bhatti, cricketer
 Ijaz Ahmed, cricketer
 Ijaz Butt, former PCB Chairman
 Nasir Ali, hockey player
 Tariq Sheikh, hockey player 
 Qaiser Abbas, cricketer
 Mansoor Amjad, cricketer
 Shakeel Ansar, cricketer
 Junaid Siddique, Bangladeshi cricketer

Journalist
 Khalid Hasan, Journalist, editor, and translator
 Kuldip Nayar, Indian Journalist

Actors and filmmakers
 Rajendra Kumar, Bollywood film actor
 Dev Anand, Bollywood film actor, born in Narowal at the time that Narowal was Tehsil of Sialkot
 AK Hangal, Bollywood film actor
 Waheed Murad, Lollywood film actor
 O. P. Ralhan,  Bollywood producer, director, writer, actor

Religious scholars
 Abdul Hakim Sialkoti, Islamic scholar
 Syed Mir Hassan, Islamic religious scholar And Teacher of Muhammad Iqbal
 Syed Faiz-ul Hassan Shah, Islamic religious scholar
 Peer Jamaat Ali Shah, Islamic scholar and proponent of Pakistan Movement
 Muhammad Ibrahim Mir Sialkoti, Islamic religious scholar and activist of Pakistan Movement

Industrialists
 Dharampal Gulati, founder of Mahashian Di Hatti (MDH) spice company and several charitable schools and hospitals in Delhi.
 Malik Riaz, Pakistani businessman, founder of Bahria Town

References

Sialkot
-list